Amenukal (Berber: ⵎⵏⴾⵍ, ⴰⵎⵏⵓⴽⴰⵍ) is a title for the highest Tuareg traditional chiefs; the paramount confederation leader.

History
Prior to the colonial period in the Maghreb and Sahel, the nomadic Tuareg federations chose a chief from among the wise men of their tribes to rule these confederacies.
In what is now Algeria, an Amenokal was at the head of the Kel Ahaggar Tuareg confederation since its establishment (circa 1750). It was maintained under colonial French suzerainty since 1903 but no longer recognized after the Algerian independence. It was finally abolished in 1977.
In the northern mountains of what is now Niger, in the early 15th century, a state called Aïr was founded by the Tuareg confederation there, under an amenokal, who was also designated by the Arabic Muslim title Sultan; hence, it is also called a Berber sultanate.

According to tradition, the first Tuareg chief was a woman, Tin Hinan, the founder of the Ahaggar community. Her monumental tomb is located at Abalessa in the Hoggar region.

Sources and references

 Ilahiane, Historical Dictionary of the Berbers (Imazighen), The Scarecrow Press, Inc.

WorldStatesmen article on Niger

Heads of state
Titles of national or ethnic leadership
Tuareg